Hassan Hakizimana (born 26 October 1990) is a Burundian former footballer who played as a defender for Atlético Olympic FC and the Burundi national team.

International career
He was called up by Lofty Naseem, the national team coach, to represent Burundi in the 2014 African Nations Championship held in South Africa.

References

External links
 
 

Living people
1990 births
Burundian footballers
Burundi international footballers
Association football defenders
Atlético Olympic FC players
Burundi A' international footballers
2014 African Nations Championship players
Sportspeople from Bujumbura